Karl Zoller (born August 30, 1963) is an American professional golfer who played on the Nationwide Tour.

Zoller was born in Cleveland, Ohio. He played college golf at Kent State University where he was an All-American in 1985. Zoller won the Nike Cleveland Open on the Nationwide Tour in 1995.

His son, Taylor, is on the golf team at Kent State.

Amateur wins
This list may be incomplete
1985 Northeast Ohio Amateur Invitational, Ohio Amateur

Professional wins (1)

Nike Tour wins (1)

Nike Tour playoff record (1–0)

References

External links

American male golfers
Kent State Golden Flashes men's golfers
PGA Tour golfers
Golfers from Cleveland
1963 births
Living people